Billy or Bill Bell may refer to:

Entertainment
Billy Bell (SYTYCD), a dancer from So You Think You Can Dance
Billy Bell (Them), former member of the band Them
Bill Bell (music producer), music producer and former husband of Tara MacLean

Sports
Billy Bell (ice hockey) (1891–1952), Canadian ice hockey player
Billy Bell (footballer) (1904–?), English footballer
Billy Bell (Canadian football) (1923–2019), Canadian football player
Bill Bell (American football) (1947–2022), American gridiron football player
Bill Bell (cricketer) (1931–2002), New Zealand cricketer 
Bill Bell (baseball) (1933–1962), American baseball player
Bill Bell (basketball) (1927–2016), Canadian Olympic basketball player
Bill Bell (pickleball) (1924–2006), one of the creators of the racket sport pickleball

Other
Billy Bell (politician) (born 1935), British politician
Bill Bell (businessman) (1932–2013), English football chairman
Bill Bell (mayor) (born 1941), American politician
Bill Bell (solicitor) (1912–2012), British lawyer and army officer

See also
William Bell (disambiguation)